Castelnaudary – Villeneuve Airport (ICAO code: LFMW) is a civil airport in Villeneuve-la-Comptal, Aude department, 2.5 km south-east of Castelnaudary.

A campus of the École nationale de l'aviation civile (French Civil Aviation University) is located on the aerodrome.

References 

Airports in Occitania (administrative region)